The Ford typewriter was an early prototype typewriter introduced in 1895 by Eugene A. Ford, who later became chief development engineer at IBM (no relation to Henry Ford who founded the Ford Motor Company).   It was a commercial failure and only a few were manufactured.  Unlike many competing typewriters of this time, it was a forward-striking machine, meaning the hammer struck forward against the paper which was held against the platen roller, instead of up from underneath.  This allowed the typist to see the text as it was typed, which was not possible in most other typewriters of the time.   It was unique in being the first typewriter with an aluminum frame. A "commercial failure," Ford typewriters were made in limited numbers and today are sought after by collectors.

References

External links 

 Ford Typewriter at the Martin Howard Collection
 Ford Typewriter for information about the Ford typewriter from Tony Casillo, as well as an interesting story of a typewriter find.

Typewriters